Sanjō Street（三条通 さんじょうどおり sanjō dōri）is a major street that crosses the center of the city of Kyoto from east to west, running from Shinomiya in the Yamashina-ku ward (east) to the vicinity of the Tenryū-ji in Arashiyama (west).

History 
The street corresponds to the Sanjō Ōji street of the Heian-kyō, being at that time 30 meters wide. During the Muromachi period the Sanjō Bridge was constructed in order to facilitate the crossing of military horses. During the Edo period the Sanjō Bridge became the final point of the 53 stations of the Tōkaidō, being separated from Edo by a distance of 490 km. After the Meiji period several western style buildings were constructed along the street, many remaining to this day.

Present Day 
Nowadays the street is a popular destination for both locals and visitors, as it hosts a large number of stores, shops, cafes and restaurants, as well as many historical buildings. It is also part of the route of the Kankō-sai procession part of the Gion Matsuri, held the 24th of July every year.

Relevant landmarks along the street 
 Lake Biwa Canal
 Keage Station
 Keage Incline
 Nanzen-ji temple
 Sanjō Keihan Station
Sanjō Bridge
Kamo River
Shikyōgoku Street
Teramachi Street
Art Complex Building (1928), currently GEAR (theatre show) venue
Niwaka Building by Ando Tadao
 The Museum of Kyoto
 Building of the former Kyoto office of the Bank of Japan (1906)
 Nakagyō-ku ward post office (1902)
Nippon Telegraph and Telephone West Corporation (NTT) Kyoto Branch
 Building of the Shinpukan (1926)
 Sanjō shopping street（三条商店街）
Shimadzu Corp. headquarters
 Toei Kyoto Studio Park
 Arashiyama

External links 
 Toei Kyoto Studio Park
 The Museum of Kyoto
GEAR

References 

Streets in Kyoto